Matt Sain was a member of the Missouri House of Representatives from 2019 to 2021. In 2018, he defeated incumbent Kevin Corlew by a margin of less than 100 votes. He was planning to run for re-election but eventually withdrew from the Democratic Primary.

Missouri House of Representatives

Committee assignments 

 Administration and Accounts Committee
 Crime Prevention and Public Safety Committee
 Pensions Committee
 Utilities Committee

Electoral history

References

Democratic Party members of the Missouri House of Representatives
Living people
Year of birth missing (living people)
Place of birth missing (living people)
Lindenwood University alumni
21st-century American politicians